Gonocephalus mjobergi is a species of agamid lizard. It is found in Indonesia and Malaysia.

References

Gonocephalus
Reptiles of Indonesia
Reptiles of Malaysia
Reptiles described in 1925
Taxa named by Malcolm Arthur Smith
Reptiles of Borneo